The following is a list of events affecting Canadian television in 2010. Events listed include television show debuts, finales, cancellations, and channel launches, closures and rebrandings.

Events

Television programs

Programs debuting in 2010 
Series listed here were announced by their respective networks as scheduled to premiere in 2010.

Programs ending in 2010

Television films and specials 
Bret Hart: Survival of the Hitman - March 22
Keep Your Head Up, Kid: The Don Cherry Story - March 28
The Gospel According to the Blues - June 1
Red: Werewolf Hunter - October 30
Best Trip Ever - November 27

Deaths

See also 
 2010 in Canada
 List of Canadian films of 2010

References